Clark MacGregor (July 12, 1922 – February 10, 2003) was an American  politician and Republican U.S. Representative from Minnesota's 3rd Congressional District for five terms from 1961 to 1971.

After his time in Congress, he worked as a senior assistant to President Richard Nixon, including as chairman of the president’s successful 1972 re-election campaign.

Life and career
MacGregor was born in Minneapolis, Minnesota, and graduated cum laude from Dartmouth College in 1944 and the University of Minnesota Law School in 1946. In 1949, he married Barbara Spicer; they had three daughters. Clark and Barbara were married until his death.

Congress
He was elected to the U.S. House of Representatives in 1960, defeating six-term Democratic incumbent Roy Wier, and served in the 87th, 88th, 89th, 90th, and 91st congresses, January 3, 1961 – January 3, 1971.

In 1963, MacGregor appeared in a satirical revue by Dudley Riggs' Brave New Workshop.
He was a delegate to the 1964 and 1968 Republican National Convention from Minnesota. He was an unsuccessful candidate for U.S. Senator from Minnesota in 1970, running against former Democratic Vice President Hubert Humphrey.

Nixon White House
MacGregor was Assistant to Richard Nixon for congressional relations in 1970, Counsel to the President on congressional relations (1971–1972), Chairman of the Committee to Re-elect the President (July to November 1972) following John Mitchell's resignation from the position in the Watergate political scandal. In October 1972, as the reporting of Bob Woodward and Carl Bernstein began to piece together the extent of the spying and sabotage program of the Nixon campaign, MacGregor in a press conference attacked The Washington Post for allegedly "Using innuendo, third-person hearsay, unsubstantiated charges, anonymous sources, and huge scare headlines ... maliciously ... to give the appearance of a direct connection between the White House and the Watergate -- a charge the Post knows -- and a half dozen investigations have found -- to be false."

Later career and death
After 1973, he left politics. He continued to live in Washington, D.C., worked for United Technologies Corporation, and was on the boards of the National Symphony Orchestra and the Wolf Trap Foundation.

During a vacation in Pompano Beach, Florida in 2003, MacGregor died from respiratory failure.

References

External links

1922 births
2003 deaths
Dartmouth College alumni
University of Minnesota Law School alumni
Members of the Committee for the Re-Election of the President
Republican Party members of the United States House of Representatives from Minnesota
20th-century American politicians